The Raadi cemetery, is the oldest and largest burial ground in Tartu, Estonia, dating back to 1773. Many prominent historical figures are buried there. It is also the largest Baltic German cemetery in Estonia after the destruction of Kopli cemetery in Tallinn. Until 1841, it was the only cemetery in the town.

The cemetery currently includes several smaller graveyard sections, the oldest of which date back to 1773.

Origins, 1771–1773 

Between 1771 and 1772, Russian empress Catherine the Great, issued an edict which decreed that from that point on no-one who died (regardless of their social standing or class origins) was to be buried in a church crypt or churchyard; all burials were to take place in the new cemeteries to be built throughout the entire Russian empire, which were to be located outside town boundaries.

These measures were intended to overcome the congestion of urban church crypts and graveyards, and were prompted by a number of outbreaks of highly contagious diseases linked to inadequate burial practices in urban areas, especially the black plague which had led to the Plague Riot in Moscow in 1771.

The burial ground was officially opened on 5 November 1773 as the St. John's (town) parish cemetery. It also served as the University of Tartu's burial ground. The St. Mary's (country) parish and Russian Orthodox Dormition congregation cemeteries were established north-west of the St. John's in the same year. It served as the only cemetery in the town until 1841.

Decline in burials, 1939–1944 

Burials at the cemetery were drastically reduced after the transfer of Baltic German population over to western Poland in late 1939. Burials at the cemetery continued on a much smaller scale until 1944, principally among those Baltic Germans who had refused Hitler's call to leave the region.

Present state 
By the beginning of the 21st century, the expansion of the town has passed beyond the borders of the cemetery and alternative burial grounds are established elsewhere in the town. A Pseudotsuga parkway located at the cemetery is under protection.

Notable interments
 Franz Ulrich Theodor Aepinus (1724–1802), physicist
 Betti Alver (1906–1989), poet
 Paul Ariste (1905–1990), linguist
 Kalev Arro (1915–1974), Forest Brother partisan
 Lauri Aus (1970–2003), cyclist
 Karl Ernst von Baer (1792–1876), biologist
 Friedrich Bidder (1810–1894), physiologist
 Alexander Bunge (1803–1890), botanist
 Karl Ernst Claus (1796–1864), chemist and naturalist
 Karl Gottfried Konstantin Dehio (1851–1927), internist
 Jaan Eilart (1933–2006), phytogeographer and conservationist
 Friedrich Robert Faehlmann (1798–1850), philologist
 Anna Haava (1864–1957), poet and translator
 Miina Härma (1864–1941), composer
 Gregor von Helmersen (1803–1885), geologist
 Samuel Gottlieb Rudolph Henzi (1794–1829), orientalist and theologist
 Johann Voldemar Jannsen (1819–1890), journalist and poet
 Harald Keres (1912–2010), physicist
 Amalie Konsa (1873–1949), actress
 Friedrich Reinhold Kreutzwald (1803–1882), writer
 Olevi Kull (1955–2007), ecologist
 Eerik Kumari (1912–1984), naturalist and conservationist
 Julius Kuperjanov (1894–1919), military commander
 Raine Loo (1945–2020), actress
 Oskar Loorits (1900–1961), folklorist
 Juri Lotman (1922–1993), semiotician and culturologist
 Juhan Luiga (1873–1927), psychiatrist, physician, author, publicist and politician
 Leonhard Merzin (1934–1990), actor
 Otto Wilhelm Masing (1763–1832), writer
 Uku Masing (1909–1985), philosopher and folklorist
 Viktor Masing (1925–2001), ecologist
 Zara Mints (1927–1990), literary scientist
 Friedrich Parrot (1791–1841), naturalist and traveller
 Ludvig Puusepp (1875–1942), surgeon
 Edmund Russow (1841–1897), biologist
 August Sabbe (1909–1978), Forest Brother
 Hermann Guido von Samson-Himmelstjerna (1809–1868), physician
 Carl Schmidt (1822–1894), chemist
 Gustav Teichmüller (1832–1888), philosopher
 Hugo Treffner (1845–1912), pedagogue
 Mihkel Veske (1843–1890), poet and linguist

See also
 List of cemeteries in Estonia
 Nazi-Soviet population transfers
 Baltic Germans

References

External links

 

Baltic-German people
Cemeteries in Estonia
Lutheran cemeteries
Buildings and structures in Tartu
1773 establishments in Europe
18th-century establishments in Estonia
Tourist attractions in Tartu